Tallie Medel is an American actress.

Early life
Medel was born and raised in Ketchikan, Alaska,  and studied acting and theater education at Emerson College.

Medel is half Mexican.

Personal life
Medel is non-binary and uses they/them & she/her pronouns.

Filmography

Film

Television

References

External links

American film actresses
Living people
Year of birth missing (living people)
American non-binary actors

American actors of Mexican descent